Samuel Howell Ashbridge (December 5, 1848 – March 1, 1906) was an American politician. He served one term as the mayor of Philadelphia from 1899 to 1903. He was one of the mayors excoriated in Shame of the Cities, a series by muckraker Lincoln Steffens on municipal corruption. A report by the Philadelphia Municipal League referred to his administration as “a crew of municipal pirates.”

Early life
Ashbridge was born in Philadelphia on December 5, 1848 to a Quaker family. Early on he worked as a clerk for a mercantile business and a coal yard. He later had his own coal business. In 1893, he became a deputy coroner in Philadelphia and won election as coroner in 1896.

Political career

Known as "Stars and Stripes Sam" for his predilection to give patriotic speeches,  Ashbridge won the 1899 election for mayor, defeating Democrat Horace Hoskins with 145,778 votes, over 84% of the vote, out of 172,940 votes cast. He was closely associated with political bosses Matthew Quay and Israel Wilson Durham.

Contemporary sources painted Ashbridge as one of the most corrupt mayors in Philadelphia history. In 1903, Lincoln Steffens in Philadelphia: Corrupt and Contented wrote that Ashbridge had accumulated $40,000 in debt that got satisfied right before the election. Steffens relayed an account of a conversation with former Postmaster General Thomas Hicks in which Ashbridge said 

"Tom, I have been elected mayor of Philadelphia. I have four years to serve. I have no further ambitions. I want no other office when I am out of this one, and I shall get out of this office all there is in it for Samuel H. Ashbridge."

In 1901, the Quay ring pushed bills that would create new streetcar lines in Philadelphia and would ultimately hand the franchises for those lines to his affiliates. Wealthy merchant John Wanamaker offered $2.5 million (according to Steffens; the New York Times reported $5 million) for those rights but Ashbridge threw his offer letter away. and awarded the streetcar rights to a Quay/Durham associate, John Mack. Reportedly, Quay's associates were angry at coverage in the North America a local newspaper that was owned by Thomas Wanamaker, John's son. The crew attempted to intimidate Wanamaker into stopping attacks on the local machine; their methods included having Wanamaker watched by investigators. Wanamaker, rather than giving in, exposed the tactics and called for an investigation.

Some highlights of Ashbridge's tenure as mayor include proposing what would become Roosevelt Boulevard, and throwing the ceremonial first pitch at the first baseball game played at Columbia Park. After leaving office, the became president of the Tradesmen's Trust Company.

The Philadelphia Municipal League's 1905 report called out corruption from his administration on several fronts. It cited the use of police as a political arm, widespread use of patronage jobs with the city for supporters, election fraud, and "unprecedented" levels of awarding of contracts to politics and personal allies that occurred during the Ashbridge years.

He died March 24, 1906 after a long illness at the age of 57.  His net worth was an estimated $500,000 at the time of his death. He is buried at West Laurel Hill Cemetery Ashland Section, Lot 37.

References

External links
Election results

1848 births
1906 deaths
Mayors of Philadelphia
Burials at West Laurel Hill Cemetery